Season fifteen of Dancing with the Stars, called Dancing with the Stars: All-Stars, premiered on September 24, 2012, on the ABC network.

Season 15 was the first to feature an "all-star" cast of returning celebrities. Six of the returning finalists had already won the title in prior seasons: Kelly Monaco, Drew Lachey, Emmitt Smith, Apolo Anton Ohno, Hélio Castroneves, and Shawn Johnson. Additionally, it was the only season to date to offer fractional (0.5) scores. Five contestants reunited with their original partners, while the other eight danced with new partners.

Season 8 finalist Melissa Rycroft defeated season 8 champion Shawn Johnson and season 1 champion Kelly Monaco to win the trophy. This also marked the first win for professional Tony Dovolani.

Cast

Couples
The twelve returning celebrities were revealed on July 27, 2012. A thirteenth contestant was chosen by the public, from either Sabrina Bryan, Kyle Massey, or Carson Kressley. Sabrina Bryan was announced the winner on August 27. Louis van Amstel was partnered with Bryan, while the professional partners for the first twelve celebrities were revealed on August 13. The members of the dance troupe for this season were Oksana Dmytrenko, Emma Slater, Sharna Burgess, Henry Byalikov, Sasha Farber, and Sonny Fredie-Pedersen.

Host and judges 
Tom Bergeron and Brooke Burke Charvet returned as hosts, while Carrie Ann Inaba, Len Goodman, and Bruno Tonioli returned as judges. The Harold Wheeler orchestra and singers provided music throughout the season.

Scoring charts

Notes

 : This was the lowest score of the week.
 : This was the highest score of the week.
 :  This couple finished in first place.
 :  This couple finished in second place.
 :  This couple finished in third place.
 :  This couple was in the bottom two, but was not eliminated.
 :  This couple was eliminated.

Highest and lowest scoring performances 
The highest and lowest performances in each dance according to the judges' 30-point scale are as follows.

Couples' highest and lowest scoring dances
Scores are based upon a potential 30-point maximum.

Weekly scores
Individual judges' scores in the charts below (given in parentheses) are listed in this order from left to right:  Carrie Ann Inaba, Len Goodman, Bruno Tonioli.

Week 1: First Dances
Couples are listed in the order they performed.

Week 2: Top 12
Couples are listed in the order they performed.

Week 3: Iconic Dances Week
Celebrities chose an iconic routine from the previous fourteen seasons and tried to make it as "iconic" as it was previously. Couples are listed in the order they performed. There was a double elimination this week.

Week 4: Opponents' Choice Week
Individual judges scores in the chart below (given in parentheses) are listed in this order from left to right: Carrie Ann Inaba, Len Goodman, Paula Abdul, Bruno Tonioli.

All of the celebrities selected a dance style for one of their opponents. Paula Abdul served as guest judge. Couples are listed in the order they performed.

Week 5: Guilty Pleasures Week
The two couples with the highest total cumulative point average became team captains and selected teams for the Team Freestyle. The captains were Gilles & Peta and Shawn & Derek. Due to a presidential debate on October 22, this week of competition consisted of two performance shows: October 22 and 23. There was no elimination. Couples are listed in the order they performed.

Night 1
 

Night 2

Week 6: Country Week
Each couple danced to a country song. Each individual routine included a solo portion by the celebrity. All of the couples also did a group dance. The couple that impressed the judges the most received two bonus points; that was Kirstie & Maks. Couples are listed in the order they performed.

Week 7: Dance Fusion Week
Each couple performed a fusion dance of two previously learned dance styles. Due to the presidential election and effects of Hurricane Sandy for East Coast viewers, no elimination took place. There was also a swing dance marathon. Mark Ballas performed with Shawn Johnson this week, because Derek Hough was out with an injury. Couples are listed in the order they performed.

Week 8: Veterans Day/Trio Week
Each couple selected one professional who had either previously eliminated or participated in the dance troupe to perform with them in their Latin routine. There was a double elimination. In honor of Veterans Day, the first round featured performances to songs that pay homage to servicemen and women. Couples are listed in the order they performed.

Week 9: Semifinals
The couples performed one unlearned dance to a song from Michael Jackson's album Bad and one dance chosen by the other couples. This was another double elimination this week. Couples are listed in the order they performed.

Week 10: Finals
On the first night, each couple performed their favorite dance of the season and a super-sized freestyle. On the second night, they performed an instant dance in which they had to choose their dance style and music that night. Couples are listed in the order they performed.

Night 1

Night 2

Dance chart
The celebrities and professional partners danced one of these routines for each corresponding week:
 Week 1 (First Dances): One unlearned dance (cha-cha-cha or foxtrot)
 Week 2 (Top 12): One unlearned dance (jive or quickstep)
 Week 3 (Iconic Dances Week): One unlearned dance 
 Week 4 (Opponents' Choice Week): One new dance style
 Week 5 (Guilty Pleasures Week): One unlearned dance & team freestyle dances 
 Week 6 (Country Week): One unlearned dance & group freestyle dance 
 Week 7 (Dance Fusion Week): Fusion dance & swing marathon 
 Week 8 (Veterans Day/Trio Week): One unlearned dance & trio dance 
 Week 9 (Semifinals): One unlearned dance & one new dance style
 Week 10 (Finals, Night 1): Favorite dance & freestyle
 Week 10 (Finals, Night 2): Instant dance

Notes

 :  This was the highest scoring dance of the week.
 :  This was the lowest scoring dance of the week.
 :  This couple gained bonus points for winning this dance-off.
 :  This couple danced, but received no scores.

Ratings

References

External links 

Dancing with the Stars (American TV series)
2012 American television seasons